Althepus dekkingae is a species of spider of the genus Althepus. It is endemic to Java in Indonesia.

References

Psilodercidae
Endemic fauna of Java
Spiders of Indonesia
Spiders described in 1995